Kathy Pitcher is an American para-alpine skier. She represented the United States at the 1988 Winter Paralympics in Innsbruck, Austria in alpine skiing.

She won the silver medal at the Women's Giant Slalom LW6/8 event.

References 

Living people
Year of birth missing (living people)
Place of birth missing (living people)
Paralympic alpine skiers of the United States
American female alpine skiers
Alpine skiers at the 1988 Winter Paralympics
Medalists at the 1988 Winter Paralympics
Paralympic silver medalists for the United States
Paralympic medalists in alpine skiing
21st-century American women